Dominic Kwiatkowski  is head of the parasites and microbes programme at the Wellcome Sanger Institute in Cambridge and a Professor of Genomics at the University of Oxford. Kwiatkowski applies genomics and computational analysis to problems in infectious disease, with the aim of finding ways to reduce the burden of disease in the developing world.

Education
Kwiatkowski trained as a paediatrician at Guy's Hospital in London.

Career and research
Kwiatkowski spent several years in West Africa, where malaria causes high levels of infant mortality, and this has been a major focus of his research over the past thirty years.  He has made significant contributions to the understanding of malaria pathogenesis and genetic mechanisms of resistance to the disease.  He has also pioneered genome-wide association studies (GWAS) in Africa and has led large international collaborations to characterise the genomic diversity of parasite and mosquito populations around the world.  This work is yielding deep insights into the evolutionary biology of drug resistance and pesticide resistance with practical implications for disease control.

In 2005 Kwiatkowski founded a data-sharing network, MalariaGEN, which has fostered productive research collaborations in more than forty malaria endemic countries, and has become a model for equitable sharing of genetic data and research capacity building in resource-poor settings.

Awards and honours
Kwiatkowski was elected a Fellow of the Royal Society (FRS) in 2018 and a Fellow of the Academy of Medical Sciences (FMedSci) in 2000.

References

Living people
Fellows of the Royal Society
Fellows of the Academy of Medical Sciences (United Kingdom)
Fellows of St John's College, Oxford
Fellows of the Royal College of Physicians
Year of birth missing (living people)